Anaa, Nganaa-nui (or Ara-ura) is an atoll in the Tuamotu archipelago, in French Polynesia. It is located in the north-west of the archipelago, 350 km to the east of Tahiti. It is oval in shape, 29.5 km in length and 6.5 km wide, with a total land area of 38 km2 and a population of 504. The atoll is made up by eleven small barren islands with deeper and more fertile soil than other atolls in the Tuamotus. The lagoon is shallow, without entrance, and formed by three main basins. Although it does not have any navigable access, the water of the lagoon renews by several small channels that can be crossed walking.

History

The atoll of Anaa was known by the legendary cruelty of its soldiers who in the seventeenth century, dominated the north-west of the Tuamotus.

The Spanish expedition of Pedro Fernández de Quirós landed on Conversión de San Pablo on 10 February 1606, since identified as either Anaa or Hao. The sighting of Anaa was recorded by French explorer Louis Antoine de Bougainville in 1768. James Cook sighted it in 1769. Because of its shape, he called it Chain Island. Later, Anaa was visited by Spanish explorer Domingo de Bonechea,  on November 1 of 1772, who called it Isla de Todos los Santos (All Saints Island) because they arrived on All Saints' Day.

At the beginning of the nineteenth century, control of the atoll went to the Pomaré of Tahiti. Around 1850 Anaa was an active center of the nacre commerce and copra, with a maximum population of 2,000. The missionary competition between Mormons of North America and French Catholics led to a revolt in 1852, and an intervention by French colonial troops.

In 1878 and 1906 Anaa suffered severe hurricane damages and was completely flooded. After the hurricane of 1983, the only village was moved and reconstructed, incorporating a refuge shelter with capacity for all its population.

Anaa has a territorial airport which was inaugurated in 1976.

Geography 
Anaa is located 66 km south of Faaite Atoll, 78 km from Tahanea Atoll and 377 km east of Tahiti; and is an oval atoll 29.5 km long and 6.5 km wide, with a total area of 38 km2. The coral reef is made up of eleven islets with deeper and more fertile soil than the other atolls of the Tuamotu, of which nine are named:

Kereteki, Mania, Omanaotika, Oparari, Otepipi, Putuahara, Teharie, Tematahoa and Tukuhora.

The lagoon is shallow, with no navigable passages to the ocean, and consists of 3 main basins. Although it has no navigable passages, the lagoon water is renewed by several shallow channels that can be crossed on foot.

Geology 
Geologically, the atoll is the coral outgrowth (105 meters) of the top of a large volcanic seamount of the same name (the "Anaa Ridge", 11,438 m3), measuring 3,415 meters from the seafloor, formed some 52.5-59.6 million years ago.

Fauna and flora 
The atoll is home to an endemic population of long-billed warblers and its lagoon has colonies of Cardium fragum.

Tuuhora 
The main village is Tuuhora, also called Tukuhora or Anaa, with a population of about 350. The other small villages like Temarie, Otepipi, Mania and Tematahoa have small seasonal population. The population subsists mainly on fishing, the cultivation of nacre and the production of copra.

Demography 
The population was 497 in 2012, and lives mainly from fishing, mother-of-pearl farming and copra production. 

In 2017, the total population of Anaa was 494 people and its evolution is as follows:

Religion 
In 1850, Anaa was an active mother-of-pearl and copra trading centre, with a maximum population of 2000 people. In 1852, French colonial troops intervened, following an uprising resulting from competition between North American Mormons and French Catholics. Today, most of the population is affiliated with Christianity. The Catholic Church owns a religious building on the atoll (on Tukuhora) called St. Joseph's Church (Église de Saint-Joseph) which is under the Metropolitan Archdiocese of Papeete based in Tahiti.

Economy 
Most of the atoll's economic activity is related to fishing and fish farming in the hoas6, as well as copra production, with coconut plantations cultivated on virtually every motus (islets).

Anaa has an airfield (IATA code: AAA) near the main town of Tukuhora with a runway 1,400 meters long. On average, it handles about 140 flights and 3,500 passengers per year.

Commune of Anaa

The atoll Anaa is part of the commune (municipality) Anaa, that is part of the administrative subdivision of the Îles Tuamotu-Gambier. This commune also includes the associated atoll of Faaite and the uninhabited atolls of Tahanea and Motutunga. The seat of the commune is the village Tuuhora.

Overview

Faaite
Faaite is an atoll located 60 km to the north of Anaa. The total surface of the atoll is of 230 km2. Its dry land area has a surface of 9 km2. The inner lagoon has a navigable channel to the ocean. The main village is Hitianau, with a total population of 246. It was discovered by John Turnbull in 1802, the first retailer of the Pacific who used the route of Tahiti to Hawaii. Historically the atoll also has been known as Miloradovich.

Tahanea
Tahanea is an atoll of 63 km2, with three passages towards the interior of the lagoon. It is uninhabited and is visited occasionally. It was discovered by Domingo Bonaechea in 1772, who called it San Julian. It has also been known as Tchitschagof.

Motutunga
Motutunga is an uninhabited atoll, with a passage to the interior of the nonnavigable lagoon. Domingo Bonaechea called it San Blas. It has also been known as Adventure Island.

References

External links

Atoll list (in French)
Oceandots

Communes of French Polynesia
Atolls of the Tuamotus